Cunningham v Homma, is a decision of the Judicial Committee of the Privy Council that upheld a British Columbia law that prohibited Japanese Canadians and Chinese Canadians from voting.

The case originated with an attempt by Tomekichi Homma, a Japanese immigrant and naturalized Canadian, to register to vote in 1900. The registrar of voters, Thomas Cunningham, rejected Homma's application. Homma took the British Columbia government to court over the issue.

Homma was successful at the County Court and the Supreme Court of British Columbia However, the case ultimately made its way to the Judicial Committee of the Privy Council, which at that time was the highest court in the Canadian legal system. In Cunningham v Homma, the Privy Council ruled against Homma. The court determined that while the federal government had exclusive jurisdiction over the naturalization of citizens, the provinces had the right to legislate who could vote in provincial and municipal elections. There was no inherent right to vote for naturalized citizens. Provinces and their municipalities could determine who could vote, which meant they could bar any naturalized ethnic group they chose. Parks Canada has designated this case as being of National Historical Significance.

Asian Canadians would not garner the right to vote until 1949, four years after Homma died. In recognition of his contribution to the democratic system, in December 2017 the Government of Canada, through Parks Canada, dedicated a plaque in his honour at the Nikkei National Museum and Cultural Centre in Burnaby.

See also
 Royal Commission on Chinese Immigration (1885)
 Chinese Immigration Act of 1885
 Vancouver anti-Chinese riots, 1886
 Chinese Immigration Act, 1923
 Anti-Oriental riots (Vancouver)
 List of Judicial Committee of the Privy Council cases

References

1902 in Canadian case law
Canadian federalism case law
Canadian civil rights case law
Judicial Committee of the Privy Council cases on appeal from Canada
Race and law
Discrimination in Canada
Ethnic minorities
Electoral restrictions
Anti-Asian sentiment in Canada
1902 in British Columbia
Anti-Chinese activities in Canada
Anti-Japanese activities in Canada
British Columbia case law
Voter suppression